Daoud Bousbiba (born 15 January 1995) is a Dutch professional footballer who plays as a winger for Greek Football League club Fostiras.

External links
 Voetbal International profile 
 

1995 births
Living people
Footballers from Amsterdam
Dutch footballers
Dutch expatriate footballers
Dutch sportspeople of Moroccan descent
AFC Ajax players
Almere City FC players
SV TEC players
FC Eindhoven players
Gaziantep F.K. footballers
Hassania Agadir players
ADO '20 players
Kalamata F.C. players
Eerste Divisie players
Derde Divisie players
TFF First League players
Football League (Greece) players
Association football wingers
Dutch expatriate sportspeople in Turkey
Dutch expatriate sportspeople in Greece
Expatriate footballers in Turkey
Expatriate footballers in Greece
Asteras Vlachioti F.C. players
Fostiras F.C. players